The 1962 Colgate Red Raiders football team was an American football team that represented Colgate University as an independent during the 1962 NCAA University Division football season. Replacing Alva Kelley as head coach was Hal Lahar, who had served that role for five earlier seasons, compiling an overall 24–17–4 record from 1952 to 1956. Lahar led the 1962 team to a 3–5–1 record. Daniel Keating was the team captain. 

The team played its home games at Colgate Athletic Field in Hamilton, New York.

Schedule

Leading players 
Statistical leaders for the 1962 Red Raiders included: 
 Rushing: James Heilman, 321 yards on 77 attempts
 Passing: Gerald Barudin, 432 yards and 35 completions on 84 attempts
 Receiving: James Heilman, 126 yards on 13 receptions
 Total offense: Gerald Barudin, 457 yards (432 passing, 25 rushing)
 Scoring: Gerald Barudin, 26 points from 4 touchdowns and 1 two-point conversion
 All-purpose yards: James Heilman, 769 yards (321 rushing, 218 kickoff returning, 126 receiving, 95 punt returning, 9 interception returning)

References

Colgate
Colgate Raiders football seasons
Colgate Red Raiders football